The Circle L is an automobile engine produced by GM Powertrain Poland in Poland. It is a  inline-four 16-valve turbocharged diesel engine originally designed by Isuzu but now owned by General Motors. The engine is produced in Europe by General Motors for use in the Opel, Vauxhall and Chevrolet vehicles and by Honda for use in the Civic compact car.

History
In the late nineties the Japanese company Isuzu, which was known for the efficiency of its diesel engines, collaborated with General Motors on a new diesel engine for the European market for Opel and Vauxhall. For this purpose it opened a new plant in the city of Tychy, in Poland, called Isuzu Motor Polska.

Characteristics
For reasons of economy, GM and Isuzu chose not to make an engine from scratch, but rather evolved the new engine from an existing base. Thus, the Isuzu 4EE1 1.7-liter was chosen and developed into the "Circle L" family of engines, also known as the 4EE2. 

The engine kept the same dimensions of 1.7 4EE1. The main differences are in the DOHC camshafts and direct injection. The first engines mounted a simple direct injection and met the Euro 3 standard, while the later engines met Euro 4 and used common rail injection technology. The 1.7 Circle L common rail engines were the first common rail engines used in Opels.

60 percent of the components for the production of the engines at Isuzu Motor Polska come from Germany, as well as the aluminium alloy for the manufacture of the cylinder head. The Polish plant was responsible for the construction and the development of the valvetrain. The block, however, comes to Tychy already built by the Isuzu factory in Hokkaido, Japan.

These engines are particularly important for Opel since they are fitted to their best-selling models in a period in which diesel engines became extremely popular. Moreover, thanks to their great fuel economy and reduced emissions, Circle L engines were integrated into the family of Ecotec engines. Later Circle L engines became part of the Ecoflex family.

The 1.7-liter 4EE2 was offered in six variants, whose characteristics and applications are described below.

Y17DT

The abbreviation Y17DT identifies the very first Circle L engine: As already mentioned it is a Euro 3 engine with a compression ratio of 18.4:1. The unit has Denso engine management, as in most Circle L engines. A Mitsubishi TD025 turbocharger is fitted, as is an exhaust gas recirculation system. This engine was fitted in:

Opel Corsa C 1.7 DTI 16V 75 HP (2000-03);
Opel Combo C 1.7 DTI 16V (2002-04);
Opel Astra G 1.7 DTI 16V (1999-2003);
Opel Meriva 1.7 16V DTI (2003-05);

Y17DTL

The engine Y17DTL is a reduced power variant of the Y17DT, to which it differs in the absence of an intercooler. This engine, also Euro 3, was fitted in:

Opel Corsa C 1.7 16V 65 HP (2000-03);
Opel Combo C 1.7 DI 16V (2002-04);

Z17DTL

The engine Z17DTL was one of the first common rail turbo-diesel engines used by Opel. It was fitted in:

 Opel Astra G 1.7 16V CDTI (2003-04)
 Opel Astra H 1.7 CDTI (2004- 05)

Z17DT

The engine Z17DT was one of the first common rail turbo diesel engines used by Opel. It was fitted in:

Opel Corsa C 1.7 16V CDTI 101CV (2003-06);
Opel Meriva A 1.7 CDTi 16v 101CV (2003-05);

This engine meets the Euro 4 directive.

Z17DTH and A17DT

This motor is similar to the one signed Z17DT it replaces, and features a number of minor improvements. It was fitted in

Opel Meriva A 1.7 CDTI A (2005-10), 
Opel Astra H 1.7 CDTI (2004-08),
Opel Combo C 1.7 CDTI (2004-2010).
Opel Corsa C 1.7 CDTI (2003-06)
With the exception of the Opel Astra 1.7 CDTI 16V, this car had a Bosch engine management system, and the other four models are equipped with a Denso control unit. In more modern versions, introduced in 2010, this engine delivers  of maximum power at 4000 rpm, while maximum torque is always , but delivered between 1,700 and 2,550 rpm. In this configuration, this engine has been fitted to:

Opel Meriva B 1.7 CDTI (2010-13)

Z17DTR and A17DTR

These are more powerful variants (but not the most powerful) of the Circle L engines. They also meet the Euro 4 standard, but feature a slightly lower compression ratio of 18.2:1. As in all Euro 4 engine an exhaust gas recirculation system is present.

This engine was fitted in:

Opel Corsa D 1.7 CDTI 16V 125hp (2006-11);
Opel Corsa D GSi 1.7 CDTI ( 2007 -11);
Opel Meriva 1.7 CDTI 16V 125hp (2006-10);
Opel Astra 1.7 16V 5p CDTI 125hp (2007-09);
Opel Astra H SW 1.7 CDTI 16V 125hp (2007-10);
Opel Astra GTC 1.7 CDTI 16V 125hp (2007- 11 ). 

The abbreviation A17DTR identifies the Euro 5 variant, which has otherwise identical features and is fitted in:

Opel Zafira B 1.7 CDTI 16V 125hp ( 2009 -14);
Opel Astra J 1.7 CDTI 125hp (2010-11).

A17DTS

This variant has been fitted in:

Opel Corsa D 1.7 CDTI (2011-13);
Opel Astra J 1.7 CDTI 130cv (2011-14);
Opel Meriva B 1.7 CDTI 130cv (2010-13);
Opel Mokka 1.7 CDTI ( 2012 -15);
Chevrolet Cruze 1.7 VCDi (2012-14);
Chevrolet Trax 1.7 D ( 2013 - 15 ).

Z17DTJ and A17DTJ

It is fitted in:

Opel Astra H 1.7 CDTI 16v 110 bhp (2007-09);
Opel Astra J 1.7 CDTI 16v 110 bhp (2010-15);
Opel Astra GTC H / SW 1.7 CDTI 16v 110 bhp (2007-10 );
Opel Zafira B 1.7 CDTi 16v 110HP (2007-08).

A17DTC and A17DTE

This is the second diesel engine in the Opel engine range to be included in the EcoFlex range (the first was a 1.3 Multijet engine from Fiat). Introduced in 2008, is based on the Z17DTJ engine developed simultaneously, and is characterized by a reduction of friction of the moving parts in order to optimize the thermal efficiency and meet the stricter Euro 5 standard. Outputs are identical to those of the Z17DTJ. It is fitted in:

Opel Meriva B 1.7 CDTi 16v 110HP (from 2010);
Opel Zafira B 1.7 CDTi 16v 110HP (2008-14);
Opel Astra J 1.7 CDTI 16v 110HP (2010-14).

Honda
The Honda version features common rail direct injection technology, while the Opel 4EE2 unit uses low-pressure DI. Honda's purchase of the Circle-L engines was reciprocated by GM's purchase of the J35A3 V6.

Applications:
 Honda Civic (Europe)

4EE2

Applications:
 Opel Corsa
 Opel Meriva
 Opel Astra
 Opel Zafira
 Opel Vectra
 Cummins MerCruiser Recreational Sterndrive, Inboard or Jet (Boat Engine)

See also
 List of GM engines
 DMAX
 Honda N series diesel engine

External links
 Isuzu Builds 1,000,000th Circle-L 
 Mercruiser Brochure
 Mercruiser Brochure
 Mercruiser Brochure
 Mercruiser/Isuzu Venture Article 

Circle L
Honda engines
Diesel engines by model
Straight-four engines